Hazem Mohamed Ali (also Hazem Mohamed, ; born September 20, 1969) is an Egyptian sport shooter. At age thirty-nine, Mohamed made his official debut for the 2008 Summer Olympics in Beijing, where he competed in the 50 m rifle prone. He placed last out of fifty-sixth shooters in this event, by one point behind Nicaragua's Walter Martínez from the final attempt, for a total score of 576 targets.

References

External links
 
 NBC Olympics Profile

Egyptian male sport shooters
Living people
Olympic shooters of Egypt
Shooters at the 2008 Summer Olympics
1969 births
21st-century Egyptian people